Here and Nowhere Else is the third studio album and fourth LP overall by Cloud Nothings. It was released on April 1, 2014 on Carpark Records, and was produced and mixed by John Congleton.

Reception 

Acclaimed Music, a site which aggregates hundreds of critics' lists from around the world into an all-time ranking, declares the album as the 1966th most acclaimed of all-time. In 2019, Pitchfork included “I’m Not Part of Me” on their list of "The 200 Best Songs of the 2010s".

Track listing

References 

2014 albums
Cloud Nothings albums
Carpark Records albums
Albums produced by John Congleton
Wichita Recordings albums